Alpha Sextantis (α Sex, α Sextantis) is the brightest star in the equatorial constellation of Sextans. It is visible to the naked eye on a dark night with an apparent visual magnitude of 4.49. The distance to this star, as determined from parallax measurements, is around 280 light years. This is considered an informal "equator star", as it lies less than a quarter of a degree south of the celestial equator. In 1900, it was 7 minutes of arc north of the equator. As a result of a shift in the Earth's axial tilt, it crossed over to the Southern Hemisphere in December 1923.

The variability of Alpha Sextantis was discovered by Aven Magded Hamadamen and included in the International Variable Star Index. The star is an ellipsoidal variable star.

This is an evolved A-type giant star with a stellar classification of A0 III. It has around three times the mass of the Sun and 4.5 times the Sun's radius. The abundance of elements is similar to that in the Sun. It radiates 120 times the solar luminosity from its outer atmosphere at an effective temperature of 9,984 K. Alpha Sextantis is around 295 million years old with a projected rotational velocity of 21 km/s.

References

External links
 Astronomy Knowledge Database

A-type giants
Sextans (constellation)
Sextantis, Alpha
BD+00 2615
Sextantis, 15
087887
049641
03981